Steve Dennis Timmons (born November 29, 1958) is an American former volleyball player who represented the United States at three consecutive Summer Olympics starting in 1984, winning gold in 1984 and 1988 plus a bronze in 1992.

Steve played volleyball and basketball at Newport Harbor High School.  He then attended Orange Coast College (OCC), playing for the OCC Pirates basketball team that won the California Community College Athletic Association (CCCAA) state basketball championship and the Pirates volleyball team that was runner-up in the CCCAA state volleyball championship. Timmons then attended the University of Southern California, playing for the Trojans volleyball team that won the 1980 NCAA men's volleyball tournament.

Timmons' Olympic teammate, Karch Kiraly, has also been a teammate on other teams, including the USA team at the 1986 World Championship and the 1986 Goodwill Games, as well as professional teammates with Italian league team Porto Ravenna Volley, where they won the Italian Volleyball League in 1991 and the CEV Champions League in 1992.

Timmons co-founded and is the former president of Redsand, an action sports clothing and lifestyle brand, which he sold in 2003.

Timmons was married to basketball executive Jeanie Buss, daughter of Jerry Buss, from 1990 to 1993. From 1997 to 2018, he was married to actress Debbe Dunning (Heidi on Home Improvement) and they have three children together.

See also

 USA Volleyball

References

External links
 Volleyball Hall of Fame
 

1958 births
Living people
Volleyball players at the 1984 Summer Olympics
Volleyball players at the 1988 Summer Olympics
Volleyball players at the 1992 Summer Olympics
Olympic gold medalists for the United States in volleyball
Olympic bronze medalists for the United States in volleyball
Sportspeople from Newport Beach, California
USC Trojans men's volleyball players
American men's volleyball players
Medalists at the 1984 Summer Olympics
Medalists at the 1988 Summer Olympics
Medalists at the 1992 Summer Olympics
Newport Harbor High School alumni
Goodwill Games medalists in volleyball
Competitors at the 1986 Goodwill Games
Opposite hitters
Pan American Games medalists in volleyball
Pan American Games gold medalists for the United States
Medalists at the 1987 Pan American Games